Primat may refer to:

Primat of Saint-Denis (d. c. 1277), French monk and historian
a standard size of wine bottle

See also
Primate (disambiguation)